The Sar Pass is in Parvati Valley of Kullu district of Himachal Pradesh, a state of India. 

Sar, in the local dialect, means a lake. While trekking across the path from Tila Lotni to Biskeri Ridge, one has to pass by a small, usually frozen lake (Sar) and hence the name Sar Pass Trek.

How To Reach

Air
The airport is also known as Kullu-Manali airport and has more than a kilometre long runway. Air India and some private airlines have regular flights to the airport. Recently Himalayan Bulls in collaboration with Deccan Charters have started flights on Kullu-Chandigarh-Kullu sector three times a day. Daily flight service (except Tuesday) has been started by 15 May 2013 at Bhunter airport by Air India from Delhi to Bhuntar and vice versa.
Chandigarh Airport is the nearest international airport.

Road
Kasol is 30 km from Bhunter, and Bhunter can be reached from Delhi by national highway NH 1 up to Ambala and from there NH 22 to Chandigarh  and from there by national highway NH21 that passes through Bilaspur, Sundernagar, Mandi and Kullu towns. Buses (including Volvo and Mercedes Benz) on this route are available from all major bus terminals.

Rail
Kasol is not easily approachable by rail. The nearest broad gauge railheads are at Chandigarh, Pathankot and Kalka. The nearest narrow gauge railhead is at Joginder Nagar.

See Bhanupli–Leh line for the proposed railway line through this area.

Gallery

View from Nagaru Camp (12,500ft)

External links
 Base Camp at Kasol To Grahan Trek
 Birds of Sar Pass Trek & Saurkundi Pass Trek
 Butterflies of Sar Pass Trek & Saurkundi Pass Trek
 Landscapes of Sar Pass Trek

See also 
 Saurkundi Pass Trek

References 

Kullu
Hiking trails in Himachal Pradesh